Readlyn is a city in Bremer County, Iowa, United States. The population was 845 at the time of the 2020 census. It is part of the Waterloo–Cedar Falls Metropolitan Statistical Area.

Geography
Readlyn is located at  (42.703325, -92.226320).

Demographics

2010 census
As of the census of 2010, there were 808 people, 338 households, and 222 families living in the city. The racial makeup of the city was 98.0% White, 0.5% African American, 0.1% Native American, 0.5% Asian, 0.6% from other races, and 0.2% from two or more races. Hispanic or Latino of any race were 1.2% of the population.

There were 338 households, of which 34.0% had children under the age of 18 living with them, 57.7% were married couples living together, 5.6% had a female householder with no husband present, 2.4% had a male householder with no wife present, and 34.3% were non-families. 32.2% of all households were made up of individuals, and 17.2% had someone living alone who was 65 years of age or older. The average household size was 2.39 and the average family size was 3.01.

The median age in the city was 37.8 years. 28.1% of residents were under the age of 18; 5% were between the ages of 18 and 24; 26.1% were from 25 to 44; 23.9% were from 45 to 64; and 16.7% were 65 years of age or older. The gender makeup of the city was 48.0% male and 52.0% female.

2000 census
As of the census of 2000, there were 786 people, 322 households, and 223 families living in the city. The racial makeup of the city was 98.35% White, 0.38% African American, 0.13% Native American, 0.64% Asian, and 0.51% from two or more races. Hispanic or Latino of any race were 0.25% of the population.

There were 322 households, out of which 32.9% had children under the age of 18 living with them, 60.6% were married couples living together, 6.5% had a female householder with no husband present, and 30.7% were non-families. 28.9% of all households were made up of individuals, and 18.6% had someone living alone who was 65 years of age or older. The average household size was 2.44 and the average family size was 3.01.

27.7% were under the age of 18, 5.6% from 18 to 24, 24.8% from 25 to 44, 23.9% from 45 to 64, and 17.9% were 65 years of age or older. The median age was 39 years. For every 100 females, there were 94.6 males. For every 100 females age 18 and over, there were 84.4 males.

The median income for a household in the city was $41,625, and the median income for a family was $52,308. Males had a median income of $32,313 versus $24,625 for females. The per capita income for the city was $17,721. About 2.4% of families and 2.7% of the population were below the poverty line, including 2.1% of those under age 18 and 5.3% of those age 65 or over.

Education
The Wapsie Valley Community School District operates local public schools.

References

Cities in Bremer County, Iowa
Cities in Iowa
Waterloo – Cedar Falls metropolitan area